Luchetti is a surname. Notable people with the surname include:

 Antonio S. Luchetti (1888-1958), Puerto Rican engineer and public servant
 Cathy Luchetti (born 1945), American author
 Daniele Luchetti (born 1960), Italian film director, screenwriter and actor
 Emily Luchetti, American chef
 Rosario Luchetti (born 1984), Argentine Olympic field hockey player
 Sergio Luchetti (born 1958), Argentine Olympic fencer
 Tony Luchetti (1904–1984), Australian politician
 Veriano Luchetti (1939–2012), Italian tenor
 Walter Luchetti (born 1937), Italian politician